R. Varadarajan was an Indian politician and former Tamilnadu Member of the Legislative Assembly. He was elected to the Tamil Nadu legislative assembly as a Marumalarchi Dravida Munnetra Kazhagam candidate from Virudhunagar constituency in 2006 election.

References 

Tamil Nadu politicians
Living people
Year of birth missing (living people)
Marumalarchi Dravida Munnetra Kazhagam politicians
Tamil Nadu MLAs 2006–2011